Lisa Connor is an American soap opera writer, producer, and director. She is a writer on the ABC Daytime and The Online Network serial drama All My Children.

In 2020 she was one of the recruits for a fiction app named "Radish" which had $63m of funding and it was opening an office in LA. The soap writers recruited included Janet Iacobuzio, Addie Walsh, Leah Laiman, and Jean Passanante.

Positions held
All My Children
Co-Head Writer: May 29, 2013 - September 2013 (hired by Prospect Park)
Script Editor: Jan 29, 2013 - September 2013 (hired by Ginger Smith)
Script Writer: May 3, 2010 - December 2010 (hired by Lorraine Broderick) 
Breakdown Writer: April 2002 - January 5, 2005; January 6, 2011 - September 23, 2011 (hired by Richard Culliton)
Supervising Producer: 1999 - March 2002 (hired by Jean Dadario Burke)

As the World Turns
Script Writer: June 30, 2008 - December 2008
Breakdown Writer: 1997 - 1999; March 3, 2005 - January 24, 2008; April 18, 2008 - June 27, 2008

Days of Our Lives
Breakdown Writer: May 22, 2012 - August 13, 2012
Script Writer: September 26, 2016 – present

General Hospital
Occasional Script Writer: October 20, 2011; December 6, 2011; December 8, 2011
Occasional Breakdown Writer: January 6, 2012

Guiding Light
Script Writer: 1994
Associate Director: 1992 - 1994
Production Coordinator: 1980s

One Life to Live (hired by Michael Malone)
Script Writer: 1995 - 1996

The Young and the Restless (hired by Maria Arena Bell and Hogan Sheffer)
Script Writer (April 30, 2009 - March 25, 2010)
Breakdown Writer (March 30, 2009 - August 4, 2009)

Awards and nominations
Daytime Emmy Awards

Nominations
2003–2004, 2006: Best Writing, As The World Turns
2001 & 2002: Best Drama Series, All My Children
2000: Best Writing, As The World Turns
1996: Best Writing, One Life To Live
1993: Best Directing;, Guiding Light

Wins 
1994: Best Directing, Guiding Light

Writers Guild of America Award

Nominations 
1997, 1998, 2005 & 2006 seasons: As The World Turns

Wins 
2003 season: All My Children

References

External links
 

American soap opera writers
American television directors
American women television directors
Daytime Emmy Award winners
Living people
Soap opera producers
Writers Guild of America Award winners
Place of birth missing (living people)
Year of birth missing (living people)
American women television producers
American women television writers
Women soap opera writers
21st-century American women